Tecovas may refer to:

Tecovas Creek, a creek in Potter County, Texas, USA
Tecovas Formation, a geological formation in Texas

See also
Tecovasaurus, an extinct Late Triassic amniote genus